Allan Quilantang (born December 13, 1958), popularly known by his stage name Allan K., is a Filipino comedian, actor, singer and TV host. He is one of the co-hosts of the noontime variety show Eat Bulaga!

Career

Allan K's first appearance in Eat Bulaga! was in the segment "Bulagaan"; before joining the show he performed in bars, and in other countries.

He became a regular host of Eat Bulaga! with his own segment entitled "Allan Nose (a pun on the English word knows) Best".

During his stay in Eat Bulaga!, one challenge for him was to walk from Broadway Centrum (Quezon City) to Cathedral of Antipolo (estimated distance: 16.8 km) and perform in the EB Babes' Bebot division competition.

Alongside Eat Bulaga!, Allan K was also a host of All Star K! The 1 Million Peso Videoke Challenge together with singer and host Jaya Ramsey from 2004 to 2009.

Allan K previously hosted BandaOke with co-host Jaya Ramsey, and co-hosted the comedy talent show Comedy Bar with Eugene Domingo.

Allan K was inducted into the "Philippines Eastwood City Walk of Fame" in 2014 for contributing his singing, acting, and hosting.

He owned comedy bars Klownz and Zirkoh. Several celebrities permanently performed nightly at his comedy bars. Unfortunately, both establishments filed for bankruptcy in 2020, because of the COVID-19 pandemic, which greatly affected the economy.

On the December 12, 2020 episode of Eat Bulaga's segment Bawal Judgmental, he and his co-host Wally Bayola admitted that they were afflicted with COVID-19. In his statement, he said that he was brought to a hospital ICU because of the severity of his infection. Luckily Allan K quickly recovered from the virus and its effects.

Allan K identifies as gay.

Filmography

Television

Film 
 Run Barbi Run (1995)
 Rubberman (1996)
 Hindi Ako Ander... Itanong Mo Kay Kumander (1996)
 Onyok Tigasin (1997)
 Sabi Mo Mahal Mo Ako, Wala ng Bawian (1997)
 Bilib Ako Sa'yo (1999)
 Ms. Kristina Moran: Babaeng Palaban (1999)
 Bakit Ba Ganyan? (Ewan Ko Nga Ba, Darling) (2000)
 Bahay ni Lola (2001)
 Bakit Papa (2002)
 Singsing ni Lola (2002)
 Fantastic Man (2003)
 Ispiritista: Itay, May Moomoo! (2005)
 Lovestruck (2005)
 Enteng Kabisote 3: Okay Ka, Fairy Ko: The Legend Goes On and On and On (as Ina Magenta) (2006)
 TxT (2006)
 Pasukob (2007)
 Urduja (voiceover) (2008)
 Ang Darling Kong Aswang (2009)
 D' Kilabots Pogi Brothers Weh?!? (2012)
 Si Agimat, si Enteng at si Ako (2012)
 Enteng Kabisote 10 and the Abangers (2016)
 Jack Em Popoy: The Puliscredibles (2018)

Awards
Winner, Best Male TV Host For Eat Bulaga on GMA 7 in 2011
Inducted into the Philippines Eastwood City Walk of Fame 2014

See also
 Ruby Rodriguez
 Toni Rose Gayda
 Pia Guanio

References

1958 births
Living people
People from Bacolod
Male actors from Negros Occidental
Filipino male comedians
Filipino gay actors
Filipino gay musicians
Gay comedians
Gay singers
GMA Network personalities
Filipino male television actors
Filipino television variety show hosts
Filipino LGBT comedians
Filipino LGBT broadcasters
Filipino LGBT singers
Filipino male film actors
Hiligaynon people
20th-century Filipino LGBT people
21st-century Filipino LGBT people